Pimephales, commonly known as the bluntnose minnows (a term used locally to refer to Pimephales notatus specifically), is a genus of cyprinid fish found in North America. All of the four species are small fish, with P. notatus being the largest at 11 cm. (about 4.3 in.)
These minnows can be found all over North America and are commonly used as fish bait.

Species 
 Pimephales notatus (Rafinesque, 1820) (bluntnose minnow)
 Pimephales promelas Rafinesque, 1820 (fathead minnow)
 Pimephales tenellus (Girard, 1856) (slim minnow)
 Pimephales vigilax (S. F. Baird & Girard, 1853) (bullhead minnow)

References
 

 
Fish of North America
Taxa named by Constantine Samuel Rafinesque